Boomer Island is a tied island in the south east region of Tasmania, Australia. It is known for a large castle built upon it and is owned by Gunter Jaeger, a businessman.

Tenure 
The landmass is Crown land from the high-water mark to 30 metres inland. The landlocked parcel of land within this crown land is privately owned.

Geography 
An artificial tombolo connects the landmass to the mainland in Boomer Bay, which itself lies within Blackman Bay. 

The island can be seen in several public photographs.

See also 

 List of islands of Tasmania

References

Islands of South East Tasmania
South East Tasmania
Private islands of Tasmania